Shalanky is a village in western Ukraine, within Berehove Raion of Zakarpattia Oblast, but was formerly administered as part of Vynohradiv Raion.

Geography
The village is located around 16 km northwest of Vynohradiv  on the bank of the brook Borzsa. Administratively, the village belongs to the Berehove Raion, Zakarpattia Oblast.

Population
The population includes 3110 inhabitants, mostly Hungarians, with a density of 0,280 people / km2

Notes

Villages in Berehove Raion